
Gmina Ożarowice is a rural gmina (administrative district) in Tarnowskie Góry County, Silesian Voivodeship, in southern Poland.

Villages

Gmina Ożarowice contains the villages and settlements of Celiny, Niezdara, Ossy, Ożarowice, Pyrzowice, Sączów, Tąpkowice and Zendek.

Neighbouring gminas
Gmina Ożarowice is bordered by the town of Miasteczko Śląskie and the gminas of Bobrowniki, Koziegłowy, Mierzęcice, Siewierz, Świerklaniec and Woźniki.

References

Ozarowice
Tarnowskie Góry County